Mine Own Executioner is a 1947 British psychological thriller drama film starring Burgess Meredith and directed by Anthony Kimmins, and based on the novel of the same name by Nigel Balchin. It was entered into the 1947 Cannes Film Festival. The title is derived from a quotation of John Donne's "Devotions", which serves as the motto for the original book.

Plot
Felix Milne (Meredith) is an overworked psychologist with psychological problems of his own.  Molly Lucian seeks Milne's help in treating her husband Adam, traumatised from his experiences in a Japanese POW camp.  Adam is about to become severely schizophrenic. To make matters worse, Felix finds his own home life deteriorating.

Cast
 Burgess Meredith as Felix Milne
 Kieron Moore as Adam Lucian
 Dulcie Gray as Patricia Milne
 Michael Shepley as Peter Edge
 Christine Norden as Barbara Edge
 Barbara White as Molly Lucian
 Walter Fitzgerald as Dr. Norris Pile
 Edgar Norfolk as Sir George Freethorne
 John Laurie as Dr. James Garsten
 Martin Miller as Dr. Hans Tautz
 Clive Morton as Robert Paston
 Joss Ambler as Julian Briant
 Jack Raine as Inspector Pierce
 Laurence Hanray as Dr. Lefage
 Helen Haye as Lady Maresfield
 John Stuart as Dr. John Hayling

Production
The American actor Burgess Meredith was cast in the lead. At the same time, his wife Paulette Goddard was also hired by Alexander Korda to appear in An Ideal Husband (1947).

Australian Frederic Hilton worked as technical adviser.

Reception
The New York Times noted a "serious, adult and highly interesting film drama both in point of view and execution," singling out the work of writer Balchin, director Kimmins, and producer Korda, alongside stars Burgess Meredith and Kieron Moore.

The film was picketed on its US release by the Sons of Liberty, an anti-British group active at the time. The picketing was part of the group's call to boycott British films and products, and had little to do with Mine Own Executioner in itself.

References

External links

Review of film at Variety

1947 films
1947 drama films
1940s psychological thriller films
British drama films
British black-and-white films
Films based on British novels
Films directed by Anthony Kimmins
Films scored by Benjamin Frankel
Films set in London
Films produced by Alexander Korda
Films with screenplays by Nigel Balchin
Medical-themed films
1940s English-language films
1940s British films